L'Âme de Pierre ("Pierre's soul" or "The Soul of Stone") is a French novel by Georges Ohnet, first published in 1890.

It was adapted for the screen twice: in 1918 and in 1929.

Synopsis 
At a dinner party hosted by Prince Patrizzi, Doctor Davidoff shares the idea that a person may save the life of a loved one who is deathly ill, by giving them their soul, at the price of their own life. This makes a great impression on Pierre Laurier, a painter, and Jacques de Vignes, who is seriously ill himself. 

The same evening, Pierre disappears after having been dismissed by his mistress, the beautiful Clémence Villa, leaving behind a suicide note in which he expresses the wish to give up his soul to restore Jacques' health...

References

External links 

19th-century French novels
1890 novels
Novels by Georges Ohnet
French novels adapted into films